Querceto (Oak Wood) is a frazione in the comune of Montecatini Val di Cecina of the Province of Pisa in Italy. The village is located on the slopes of Mount Aneo, near Volterra

Footnotes

Bibliography 
 Accademia libera natura e cultura, Querceto Percorsi, Spirito Libero Publinship, 2010, 

Frazioni of the Province of Pisa